Petra Laseur (born 26 November 1939) is a Dutch theatre and film actress. She has appeared in more than thirty films since 1960.

Selected filmography

References

External links 

1939 births
Living people
Dutch film actresses
Dutch stage actresses